Edelberto Dosi (28 January 1852 – 25 September 1891) was an Italian painter and composer active in Parma. As a painter, his subjects were mainly landscapes and vedute.

Biography
He painted a Cloister of the Ospedale Civile of Parma, once displayed in the Royal Gallery of Parma. He painted a Paesaggio Egiziano, Fiori, Romanza, and Quadro in cornice d' ebano e figure sacre for the April 1880 Esposizione parmense di arte antica.

He trained in the Academy of Fine Arts of Parma, and was a pupil of Italo Azzoni. In 1880, he composed a romanza for soprano to words of Luigi Capranica, titled La Moribonda. In 1882, he also wrote a waltz for pianoforte, to words by Adolfo Cortesi, titled Pane, burro e vino bianco. In 1882, his military march, Attenti! was played in the Piazza Grande di Parma, by the band of the 70th Regiment of Infantry.

References

1852 births
1891 deaths
19th-century Italian painters
Italian male painters
Painters from Parma
19th-century Italian male artists
19th-century Italian composers
Musicians from Parma